Lee Ayumi (born August 25, 1984), professionally known as Ayumi (previously Ahyoomee) in South Korea and Yumi Itō (previously ICONIQ) in Japan, is a Japanese-born South Korean singer, actress and entertainer based in Japan and South Korea. She debuted under the stage name Ahyoomee in 2001, as the leader and lead vocalist of South Korean girl group Sugar, a position she served in until the group's disbandment in 2006. Following the disbandment, Lee embarked on a solo career in South Korea under SM, releasing two digital singles. In 2008, she returned to Japan and began an acting career under the Japanese stage name Yumi Itō. In 2009, she debuted as a singer in Japan, under Avex's Rhythm Zone, taking the stage name Iconiq, and released a studio album, an EP, and seven digital singles.

Early life 
Lee Ayumi was born in Tottori, Japan on August 25, 1984 to a Korean mother from Chungcheong and a second-generation Zainichi Korean father. She lived in Japan until the age of 15 before moving to South Korea, later attending the Korea Kent Foreign School (ko).

Career

2001–2006: Sugar 
Ahyoomee was scouted by the entertainment company Starworld at a H.O.T. concert, later debuting as a part of Korean girl group Sugar in 2001. The band released two albums in Japan and three in South Korea, to moderate commercial success.

During her career in Sugar, she and Park Soo-jin had a guest appearance on the Gag Concert 200th episode special, in the sketch Poncho Siblings (우비 삼남매), making them the first girl group to appear on the program. In December 2006, Starworld announced they would not offer Sugar new contracts, thus disbanding the group following the expiration of their contracts.

2006–2012: solo career 
On July 13, 2006, Ayumi released her first digital single under SM Entertainment, titled "Cutie Honey", a cover of the theme song to the Cutie Honey anime series. Her second single, a cover of Kim Gun Mo's song, "Jalmotdoen Mannam" ("Wrongful Meeting"), was released on November 7, 2006.

In February 2007, following her contract expiration with Starworld, she switched labels, moving to the parent label SM Entertainment. Under SM Entertainment, Ayumi started collaborating with SM Town on their summer and winter albums that year. However, she did not release any solo material at this time.

In 2008, she made her acting debut in Japan as Itō Yumi. Afterwards, she travelled to Los Angeles to study dance, and find new inspiration as a musician.

In 2009, she returned to Japan and made her solo debut as Iconiq under Avex label Rhythm Zone. Her first activities under Avex were for Shiseido's Maquillage cosmetics line, where her song "I'm Lovin' You" (a duet with Exile vocalist Atsushi) was used in commercials, and Lee's image was used in billboards for the promotion of the line. Iconiq was marketed around her buzz cut hair-style.

On March 10, 2010 she released her debut album, Change Myself, which included the promotional singles "Change Myself" and "Bye Now!", which were used for advertising the Maquillage cosmetic line once more. The album debuted at #3 on Oricon's albums chart, the highest position for a debut album since Yui Aragaki's Sora in late 2007. On August 11, 2010, she released her debut single "Tokyo Lady", which was later included in her first EP Light Ahead in September. The EP was promoted with three music videos directed by Diane Martel. After a two year hiatus from releasing music, Lee released two digital singles on March 14, 2012, titled LADIES and MAKE IT RIGHT.

2015–present: acting career and departure from Avex 
In 2015, Lee returned to South Korea, appearing on the JTBC program Witch Hunt, marking her first television appearance in South Korea after nine years.

In August 2016, in an interview with SENSE (ja) magazine, Lee stated she would be going back to being an actress, using the name Itō Yumi. In September of the same year, she starred as Michiru Saiki in the stage play adaption of the manga ReLIFE.

In May 2017, Lee was cast in a Fuji TV drama, Code Blue Season 3. In August 2017, Lee was confirmed as a cast member of MBN's new South Korean variety show Flying Girl.

In March 2019, Lee announced that she had signed a contract with the South Korean agency BONBOO Entertainment. On January 20, 2020, Lee announced on her blog that, after eleven years, she would be leaving Avex, after the expiration of her contract.

Personal life
In September 2022, Lee released a pre-wedding photo revealing that she would marry her non-celebrity foreign boyfriend who is two years older than her on October 30.

Discography

Studio album

Extended play

Singles

Filmography

Film

Television drama

Television shows

Awards

Korean Music Awards

|-
|rowspan=2 align="center"| Korean Music Awards 2007
|rowspan=2 align="center"| Lee Ah-yoo-mi "Cutie Honey"
| Album of the year
| 
|-
| Best pop album
|

Notes

References

External links
  

1984 births
Living people
South Korean women pop singers
Japanese women pop singers
Japanese-language singers of South Korea
Avex Group artists
Zainichi Korean people
South Korean female idols
Musicians from Tottori Prefecture